ARC International may refer to:

ARC (processor), the Argonaut RISC Core, a series of embedded computer processors developed by ARC International PLC
Synopsys ARC, the developer of the ARC embedded processor series
Arc International, a privately held French housewares company